Universal Orlando's Horror Make-Up Show (previously titled The Phantom of the Opera Horror Make-Up Show and The Gory, Gruesome and Grotesque Horror Make-Up Show) is a live show located at Universal Studios Florida that opened on June 7, 1990, along with the theme park. It is a live demonstration of Universal Pictures' legacy of horror movies, with particular emphasis on prosthetic makeup. It was inspired by the former The Land of a Thousand Faces show (1975–1980) at Universal Studios Hollywood. It is also notable for being one of two original opening-day attractions still in operation at Universal Studios Florida, the other being E.T. Adventure.

Show summary

Waiting area
The show is housed within a recreation of the Pantages Theatre. The lobby/waiting area includes multiple displays on Universal horror films including Hellboy II: The Golden Army, Psycho, Jaws, The Thing, Bride of Chucky and An American Werewolf in London. The lobby also includes displays on the Universal Monsters, The Munsters, and Universal's Halloween Horror Nights. Since 2004, the lobby has also included prop displays and clips from recent Universal horror films such as Van Helsing (2004), King Kong (2005), Hellboy II: The Golden Army (2008), The Wolfman (2010) and The Mummy (since 2017).

Main show

The show is mostly scripted, with some parts improvised between the actors and/or the audience. Sometimes, the actors may improvise quips about celebrities or about a single or all members of the audience.

It is hosted by Alex Ross (played by a male or female actor) and Universal Studios' creature creator and visual effects artist Mark James (also played by a male or female actor, in which case, if the latter, the character is instead named Marty James). While Ross is looking around the stage for James, the latter enters the theater with a large knife dug into their heart and briefly interacts with audience members before "dying", and revealing to the audience that it is a fake.

A montage of clips from gory scenes of Universal horror films is then shown on screens on both sides of the stage, showcasing the many films that Universal Pictures has released, becoming the creator and pioneer of horror as a film genre. Once the montage has ended, Ross and James pick out a volunteer from the audience to explain and demonstrate how a bloody limb cut is achieved by using a fake knife. Unbeknownst to the volunteer and the audience, the knife is a prop and the blood is fake, giving the appearance that it is cutting into the skin. Afterward, a short clip montage about Lon Chaney is shown on the screens, with James describing that Chaney kept his prosthetic makeup secrets to himself until he died. The montage goes on to describe Universal's make-up artist Jack Pierce, who was responsible for creating the designs for Universal's Classic Monsters including Dracula, Frankenstein's monster, The Wolf Man, The Mummy and Bride of Frankenstein.

After this, Ross peeks behind the curtain, and a car alarm goes off. James turns it off and questions Alex on the reasons for peeking on their secret project, which the latter usually blames on a child from the audience. Afterward, a clip of the creation of the make-up design for the title character in 1941's The Wolf Man is shown on the screens. While a clip from An American Werewolf in London is shown, James adds that it was Rick Baker who further expanded and fully developed the art of prosthetic makeup in many blockbuster films, for which he was recognized as the inaugural recipient of the Academy Award for Best Makeup and Hairstyling in 1981; James also lists Ve Neill as another renowned makeup artist to follow suit. A final clip is shown from the 2010 remake of The Wolf Man, in which Benicio del Toro transforms into the title character, while James presents on-stage how practical effects achieved the initial stages of the transformation before computer-generated imagery was utilized to fully complete it.

For the finale, James reveals their secret project: a motion capture vest which controls the movements of an "animatronic" werewolf named Eddie. Ross and James call on their volunteer from earlier to come back onstage to help demonstrate this effect (before taking a picture altogether). However, after the volunteer returns to their seat, Eddie comes alive and chases James backstage, before the latter ends the chase by seemingly killing Eddie offstage and returning to the stage bloody and bruised.

Guests leave through a hall featuring multiple posters of Universal horror films on the walls such as The Birds, Jurassic Park, and Psycho before exiting into the shared gift shop with The Bourne Stuntacular.

Previous versions

The show and lobby featured numerous other reincarnations in the past. From 1990 until 1997, the lobby featured posters from classic Universal horror films and also had a live introduction from The Phantom of the Opera. For various film releases from 1997 and forward, the lobby has been changed to feature clips and props from The Lost World: Jurassic Park (1997), The Mummy Returns (2001), Van Helsing (2004), etc.

The main show itself had some minor refurbishments in the past to fit the re-theming of the lobby. From 1990 until 2004, the main show would instead feature clips from Universal horror films such as The Thing and An American Werewolf in London, and the audience volunteer would have their picture taken with The Phantom of the Opera. For the finale, James would step into a transportation device based on The Fly and would turn into the title character and then back into themself; James would then walk backstage with Ross, still having fly wings on the first's back. This version of the show was also introduced with a gunshot by James. It was slightly re-vamped in 1997 to instead have the audience volunteer get their picture taken with a dinosaur. In 2001, the audience volunteer and a member from their party would have their picture taken with The Mummy, and a clip about the creation of the make-up effects from The Mummy Returns was also added. The lobby and the show itself have been revamped various times since 2004 to include prop displays of various Universal horror films, and clips in the show itself, from recent releases such as Van Helsing (2004), King Kong (2005), Hellboy II: The Golden Army (2008), The Wolfman (2010) and The Mummy (since 2017).

Films featured
The show originally featured clips from the films Brazil (1985), Hellboy II: The Golden Army and Jaws. Present clips shown throughout the show include:

2002 incident
In August 2002, a woman was selected from the audience to participate in the show. After being scared by Eddie, the "animatronic" werewolf, during the finale, the frightened woman fell off the stage and landed on the steps, breaking her leg. She was rushed to the hospital and released shortly afterward without any further injuries. Since the incident, the audience volunteer has been asked to return to their seat before the jump-scare happens.

Universal Studios Japan version 
A short-lived iteration of this attraction titled Monster Make-Up premiered in Universal Studios Japan in 2001, and closed due to a lack of interest from guests. The theatre went through several temporary replacements until being rethemed to the Sing on Tour attraction in 2019.

References

External links
Universal's Horror Make-Up Show at Universal Orlando Resort

1990 establishments in Florida
Universal Parks & Resorts attractions by name
Universal Studios Florida